Dejan Mišković (born 27 October 1985) is a Croatian football defender, currently playing for NK Matija Gubec.

Career
Passing through the youth ranks of NK Zagreb, Mišković signed a professional contract with the club, aged 19, after loans to NK Lučko and NK Vrapče. The young defender found it hard to break through to the first team in the following seasons, used only occasionally and on other positions. He was released 3 years into his contract and, after a short spell at Polet Buševec, spent the following 4 and a half seasons at the third-tier side NK Vrapče, before moving to NK Kustošija Zagreb in early 2013.

References

External links

1985 births
Living people
Footballers from Zagreb
Association football central defenders
Croatian footballers
NK Zagreb players
NK Lučko players
NK Vrapče players
NK Kustošija players
Second Football League (Croatia) players